Avonhead is a suburb of the New Zealand city of Christchurch. It has two primary schools, a shopping centre and several parks.

Etymology

Engineer William Bayley Bray (1812–1885) arrived in Canterbury in January 1851 on the Duke of Bronte and built a homestead at the head of the Avon River in an area with many springs, and he thus called it Avonhead. The area itself was referred to as Avonwood in early records, but Avonhead became the common term and this was formally adopted by the Waimairi County Council 1959.

Demographics

Avonhead had a population of 9,243 at the 2018 New Zealand census, an increase of 480 people (5.5%) since the 2013 census, and an increase of 297 people (3.3%) since the 2006 census. There were 3,324 households. There were 4,608 males and 4,641 females, giving a sex ratio of 0.99 males per female, with 1,605 people (17.4%) aged under 15 years, 1,950 (21.1%) aged 15 to 29, 4,056 (43.9%) aged 30 to 64, and 1,641 (17.8%) aged 65 or older.

Ethnicities were 67.0% European/Pākehā, 5.2% Māori, 2.6% Pacific peoples, 28.3% Asian, and 3.3% other ethnicities (totals add to more than 100% since people could identify with multiple ethnicities).

The proportion of people born overseas was 36.4%, compared with 27.1% nationally.

Although some people objected to giving their religion, 48.4% had no religion, 40.5% were Christian, 1.3% were Hindu, 1.3% were Muslim, 1.5% were Buddhist and 1.5% had other religions.

Of those at least 15 years old, 2,385 (31.2%) people had a bachelor or higher degree, and 948 (12.4%) people had no formal qualifications. The employment status of those at least 15 was that 3,621 (47.4%) people were employed full-time, 1,179 (15.4%) were part-time, and 267 (3.5%) were unemployed.

Economy

Retail

Avonhead Mall opened in Avonhead in the 1960s. It covers an area of 3,876 m² and has 166 carparks. There are 13 retailers, including a Countdown supermarket.

Parks

Major parks include Avonhead Park, Crosbie Park, Hyde Park, Ferrier Park and Burnside Park. There are various smaller reserves such as Stewarts Bush, Cricklewood Reserve, Westgrove Park, Staveley Reserve, Brigadoon Reserve, Bullock Reserve and Strathean Reserve.

Schools

Avonhead School

Avonhead School is a full primary school (years 1–8, or ages 5–13) within Avonhead, located between Ferrier park to the West and Avonhead Road to the East. The school has  students as of  Although located within Avonhead, the school zone also includes sections of the nearby suburbs of Ilam and Sockburn. Most students from Avonhead School go on to secondary schooling at Riccarton High School or Burnside High School. The school currently has 22 classrooms, a result of construction work undertaken to address issues of overcrowding which had been previously faced.  These were accompanied by additional work on school facilities, including the construction of a new school hall, basketball and netball courts, which had been made necessary by the construction of classrooms on the sites of previous courts.

Between 2021 and 2022 the senior playground was demolished and replaced with a hockey court with a temporary playground being constructed on the north side of the HQ which was replaced by a permanent new senior playground in June 2022. In the same year, there were also new crawling tunnels constructed near the junior playground replacing a birch tree.

Merrin School 

Located next to the Avonhead Mall, Merrin School has a roll of  students as of  Merrin is a full primary school, educating years 1 to 8. As the entirety of the school's zone is covered by Burnside High School, the majority of students go on to learn there. The school is in the planning stage of the Christchurch Schools Rebuild Programme.

References

Suburbs of Christchurch